Arthur Blackburne Poynton (28 June 1867 – 8 October 1944) was an English classical scholar. He was a Fellow and later Master of University College, Oxford.

Early life and family
Poynton was born in Kelston, Somerset, the son of the Rev. Francis John Poynton (1831–1903) and Frances Mary Billinge (1837–1930). He was educated at Marlborough College and went up to Balliol College, Oxford, in 1885. 

In 1896 he married Mary Sargent (1867–1952), the daughter of John Young Sargent, a Fellow of Hertford College. They had two sons (the classical scholar John Blackburne Poynton (1900–1995) and the civil servant Sir Arthur Hilton Poynton (1905–1996)) and three daughters.

Career
Poynton was a fellow of Hertford College, Oxford, from 1889 to 1894. In 1894, he was elected a fellow and tutor of University College, Oxford, where he would spend the rest of his career. At University College, he was a tutor to the author and academic C. S. Lewis from 1919 to 1920 and the classical scholar E. R. Dodds. He also served as bursar of University College from 1900 to 1935, and its Master from 1935 to 1937. He retired from Oxford in 1937, and was made an honorary fellow of his old college.

He was Public Orator at the University of Oxford for seven years, from 1925 to 1932. He delivered the oration for Albert Einstein at his honorary degree ceremony in the Sheldonian Theatre on 23 May 1931.

Poynton died on 8 October 1944 as the result of a motor car accident in the High Street at Oxford.

References

External links
 Books by Arthur Blackburne Poynton from Amazon.co.uk.

1867 births
1944 deaths
Alumni of Balliol College, Oxford
English classical scholars
Public Orators of the University of Oxford
Fellows of University College, Oxford
Masters of University College, Oxford
Pedestrian road incident deaths
Road incident deaths in England